Friedrich "Fritz" Krischan (August 11, 1920 – March 11, 2007) was an Austrian cross-country skier who competed in the 1950s. He finished 43rd in the 18 km event at the 1952 Winter Olympics in Oslo.  Krischan worked as a police officer and remained active in ski clubs and ski coaching for the majority of his life.

References

External links
18 km Olympic cross country results: 1948-52
Mention of Friedrich Krischan's death  

Austrian male cross-country skiers
Olympic cross-country skiers of Austria
Cross-country skiers at the 1952 Winter Olympics
1920 births
2007 deaths
20th-century Austrian people